Mercedes López-Morales is a Spanish-American astrophysicist at the Center for Astrophysics  Harvard & Smithsonian (CfA) in Cambridge, Massachusetts, who works on detection and characterization of exoplanet atmospheres.

Education and career 
López-Morales studied physics during her undergraduate program at Universidad de La Laguna, in the Canary Islands, Spain. She received her PhD in astronomy from the University of North Carolina at Chapel Hill in 2004. After completing her doctoral degree, she was a Carnegie postdoctoral fellow from 2004 until 2010 at the Carnegie Science Department of Terrestrial Magnetism (DTM) in  Washington, DC. During her tenure at the Carnegie Science DTM, López-Morales was also a postdoc at the NASA Astrobiology Institute (NAI). In 2007, López-Morales was awarded a Hubble Fellowship. While at the NAI, she worked on two different projects, From Molecular Clouds to Habitable Planetary Systems and Looking Outward: Studies of the Physical and Chemical Evolution of Planetary Systems.

Work 
Between 2010 and 2012, López-Morales returned to Spain to join the Institute of Space Sciences in Barcelona, Spain, where she was awarded a prestigious Ramón y Cajal Fellowship. She joined the Center for Astrophysics  Harvard & Smithsonian in 2012. In 2014–2015, she was a fellow at the Radcliffe Institute for Advanced Study at Harvard University, where she worked on Searching for Atmospheric Signatures of Other Worlds.

López-Morales is currently the Deputy Associate Director for Science at the Center for Astrophysics  Harvard & Smithsonian, where she also leads the Exoplanet Spectroscopy Survey (ACCESS) project where she investigates optical properties of exoplanet atmospheres using spectroscopy techniques. She is also Co-PI of the PanCET project, the largest exoplanet atmospheres program awarded time on the Hubble Space Telescope. López-Morales's work also focuses on the discovery and characterization of terrestrial exoplanets using HARPS-N, a high-resolution optical spectrograph with broad wavelength coverage located in the Northern hemisphere.

References

Year of birth missing (living people)
Living people
Harvard Fellows
Spanish astrophysicists
University of North Carolina at Chapel Hill alumni
Harvard–Smithsonian Center for Astrophysics people
21st-century Spanish scientists
Spanish women scientists